Pseudachorutinae is a subfamily of springtails in the family Neanuridae. There are more than 50 genera and 200 described species in Pseudachorutinae.

Genera
These 57 genera belong to the subfamily Pseudachorutinae:

 Acanthanura Börner, 1906
 Aethiopella Handschin, 1942
 Aethiopellina Delamare, 1951
 Anurachorutes Kuznetsova & Potapov, 1988
 Anurida Laboulbene, 1865
 Anuridella Willem, 1906
 Anuritelsa Womersley, 1939
 Arlesia Handschin, 1942
 Arlesiella Delamare-Deboutteville, 1951
 Brasilimeria Stach, 1949
 Cassagnaudina Massoud, 1967
 Cassagnaurida Salmon, 1964
 Cephalachorutes Bedos & Deharveng, 1991
 Ceratrimeria Börner, 1906
 Delamarellina Rapoport & Rubio, 1963
 Forsteramea Salmon, 1965
 Furculanurida Massoud, 1967
 Gamachorutes Cassagnau, 1978
 Gastranurida Bagnall, 1949
 Grananurida Yosii, 1954
 Halachorutes Arlé, 1966
 Handschinurida
 Holacanthella Börner, 1906
 Hylaeanura Arlé, 1966
 Intermediurida Najt, Thibaud & Weiner, 1990
 Israelimeria Weiner & Kaprus, 2005
 Kenyura Salmon, 1954
 Koreanurina Najt & Weiner, 1992
 Lanzhotia Rusek, 1985
 Linnaniemia Philiptschenko, 1927
 Megalanura Ellis & Bellinger, 1973
 Meganurida Carpenter, 1935
 Micranurida Börner, 1901
 Minotaurella Weiner, 1999
 Najtafrica Barra, 2002
 Neotropiella Handschin, 1942
 Notachorudina Cassagnau & Rapoport, 1962
 Oudemansia Schött, 1893
 Paranurida Skarzynski & Pomors, 1994
 Philotella Najt & Weiner, 1985
 Platanurida Carpenter, 1925
 Pongeia Najt & Weiner, 2002
 Pratanurida Rusek, 1973
 Protachorutes Cassagnau, 1955
 Pseudachorudina Stach, 1949
 Pseudachorutella Stach, 1949
 Pseudachorutes Tullberg, 1871
 Pseudanurida Schött, 1901
 Quatacanthella Salmon, 1945
 Rusekella Deharveng, 1982
 Sernatropiella
 Simonachorutes
 Stachorutes Dallai, 1973
 Tasmanura Womersley, 1937
 Tijucameria de Mendonca & Fernandes, 2005
 Venezuelida Diaz & Najt, 1995
 Womersleymeria Stach, 1949

References

Further reading

 

Neanuridae
Arthropod subfamilies